Carl Marshall is a Jamaican politician. He was speaker in the Jamaican House of Representatives from 1993 to 1997.

See also
List of speakers of the House of Representatives of Jamaica

References

Year of birth missing (living people)
Living people
Speakers of the House of Representatives of Jamaica
People's National Party (Jamaica) politicians
Place of birth missing (living people)